Amelia Filomena Pietrangelo (born July 14, 1993) is a Canadian soccer player who plays as a striker.

Early life 
Born in Laval, Quebec, Pietrangelo began playing soccer at the age of four for CS Monteuil. She began to play competitively at the age of eight with players a year older than herself. As a child, Pietrangelo also participated in gymnastics and figure skating.

Aged 14, she received her first call-up to Quebec's provincial team to play at the Canadian Championships and was subsequently scouted by the Canadian national team. Pietrangelo won gold at the Under-16 Canadian Championship and was named Juvenile Player of the Year by the Quebec Soccer Federation.

College career 

Pietrangelo attended Rutgers University to study Exercise Science on a full scholarship and played for the Scarlet Knights from 2011 to 2014.

She scored once in 18 games in her freshman year, and made a further 13 appearances the following year while contributing two goals. Pietrangelo made 19 appearances in her junior year, and scored four goals while starting all 20 matches as a midfielder in her senior year.

Club career

Laval Comets 
During her time at Rutgers University, she also competed with W-League side Laval Comets. After four appearances in 2011, Pietrangelo returned to the club in 2013 and scored seven goals in 24 appearances.

Indoor soccer 
In 2015, Pietrangelo competed in the Quebec Soccer League - an indoor league based in Montreal. She scored three goals in four games for Fly Emirates and 18 goals in nine games for Tough Mothers.

FC Neunkirch 
On January 6, 2016, she completed a move to Swiss club FC Neunkirch to link up with fellow Canadian international Alyssa Lagonia. During her time with the club, Pietrangelo won the Nationalliga A and the Swiss Women's Cup.

FF USV Jena  
On June 26, 2017, Pietrangelo joined Frauen-Bundesliga club FF USV Jena on a one-year contract. In doing so, she became the third Canadian to represent the club alongside Tiffany Cameron and Shannon Woeller. In the second last game of the season, she suffered a serious knee injury.

CS Monteuil
In 2021, she played with CS Monteuil of the Première Ligue de soccer du Québec, helping the team to a second place finish.

International career 
In 2010, Pietrangelo first featured in the Canadian youth program as a 16-year-old under Bryan Rosenfold. Later that year she made her international debut in a 5–0 victory against the Netherlands on December 9.

On October 18, 2011, she scored his first international goal in a 3–1 win over Costa Rica. She won gold at the 2011 Pan American Games in Guadalajara, Mexico, but was unable to appear in the championship match due to school commitments. At the end of the year, Pietrangelo was named Canadian Under-20 Player of the Year.

In 2012, she won silver at the CONCACAF Women's Under-20 Championship in Panama.

In November 2017, she received a call-up to the national team after a five-year absence.

References 

1993 births
Living people
Women's association football forwards
Canada women's international soccer players
Canadian women's soccer players
Canadian expatriate sportspeople in Germany
Canadian expatriate sportspeople in Switzerland
Canadian expatriate sportspeople in the United States
Expatriate women's footballers in Germany
Expatriate women's footballers in Switzerland
Expatriate women's soccer players in the United States
FF USV Jena players
Footballers at the 2011 Pan American Games
Rutgers Scarlet Knights women's soccer players
Soccer people from Quebec
Sportspeople from Laval, Quebec
Canadian expatriate women's soccer players
Pan American Games competitors for Canada
CS Monteuil players
Laval Comets players
USL W-League (1995–2015) players